Eva Lechner (born 1 July 1985) is an Italian multi-discipline cyclist, who has won at least one national title in cyclo-cross, road bicycle racing and mountain bike racing. She won the team relay at the 2012 Mountain bike World Championships together with Luca Braidot, Marco Aurelio Fontana and Beltain Schmid.

At the 2012 Summer Olympics, she competed in the Women's cross-country finishing in 17th place. At the 2008 Summer Olympics she finished 16th in the Women's cross-country. She was on the start list of 2018 Cross-Country European Championships and finished 8th.

Lechner won the silver medal in the women's elite race at the 2014 UCI Cyclo-cross World Championships, coming second to Marianne Vos.

Major results

Road

2007
 1st  Road race, National Road Championships
2011
 9th Overall Giro del Trentino Alto Adige-Südtirol
2012
 7th Overall Tour de Feminin
2015
 9th Giro del Trentino Alto Adige-Südtirol

Cyclo-cross

2008–2009
 1st  National Championships
 2nd Faè Di Oderzo
2009–2010
 1st  National Championships
 1st Ornavasso
2010–2011
 3rd National Championships
2011–2012
 1st  National Championships
 2nd Rome
 2nd Faè Di Oderzo
2012–2013
 1st  National Championships
 1st Milano
 2nd Faè Di Oderzo
2013–2014
 1st  National Championships
 1st Faè Di Oderzo
 2nd  UCI World Championships
 Superprestige
2nd Diegem
 UCI World Cup
3rd Rome
3rd Nommay
2014–2015
 1st  National Championships
 UCI World Cup
1st Hoogerheide
 1st Overall EKZ CrossTour
1st Baden
1st Dielsdorf
3rd Eschenbach
 Giro d'Italia Cross
1st Roma
1st Rossano Veneto
1st Faè Di Oderzo
2015–2016
 1st  National Championships
 EKZ CrossTour
1st Baden
1st Meilen
2nd Eschenbach
 1st Asolo
 2nd Overall UCI World Cup
1st Cauberg
2nd Las Vegas
3rd Namur
3rd Lignières-en-Berry
 2nd Roma
 2nd Faè Di Oderzo
 Superprestige
3rd Diegem
2016–2017
 1st  National Championships
 EKZ CrossTour
1st Baden
1st Eschenbach
 UCI World Cup
2nd Namur
 3rd Iowa City
2017–2018
 1st  National Championships
 EKZ CrossTour
1st Eschenbach
 1st Madiswil
 1st Faè Di Oderzo
 1st Brugherio
 1st Milano
 National Trophy Series
2nd Abergavenny
 3rd Overall UCI World Cup
2nd Hoogerheide
3rd Namur
3rd Heusden-Zolder
2018–2019
 1st  National Championships
 Brico Cross
1st Geraardsbergen
3rd Bredene
3rd Essen
 3rd Overijse
2019–2020
 1st  National Championships
 2nd  UEC European Championships
 Superprestige
2nd Boom
2020–2021
 3rd National Championships
 Ethias Cross
3rd Beringen
 EKZ CrossTour
3rd Hittnau
2021–2022
 1st Jesolo
 1st San Colombano
 1st Faè Di Oderzo
 2nd National Championships
2022–2023
 2nd Vittorio Veneto
 3rd Fae' Di Oderzo

Mountain bike

2002
 2nd  Cross-country, UEC European Junior Championships
2003
 2nd  Cross-country, UCI World Junior Championships
2005
 1st  Team relay, UEC European Championships
 1st  Cross-country, National Under-23 Championships
 2nd  Team relay, UCI World Championships
2006
 2nd  Team relay, UCI World Championships
 3rd  Cross-country, UEC European Under-23 Championships
2007
 UEC European Championships
1st  Under-23 cross-country
3rd  Team relay
2008
 UCI XCO World Cup
2nd Vallnord
 2nd  Team relay, UEC European Championships
 3rd  Team relay, UCI World Championships
2009
 1st  Team relay, UCI World Championships
 National Championships
1st  Cross-country
1st  Marathon
 Internazionali d'Italia Series
1st Nalles
2nd Montichiari
2010
 National Championships
1st  Cross-country
1st  Marathon
 Internazionali d'Italia Series
1st Nalles
2nd Montichiari
 UEC European Championships
2nd  Team relay
3rd  Cross-country
 3rd Overall UCI XCO World Cup
1st Houffalize
2nd Champéry
2011
 1st  Cross-country, National Championships
 1st Vermiglio
 UCI Eliminator World Cup
2nd Offenburg
 2nd Lugagnano Val d'Arda
 UCI World Championships
3rd  Cross-country
3rd  Team relay
 UCI XCO World Cup
3rd Offenburg
 3rd  Team relay, UEC European Championships
 3rd Zoetermeer
2012
 1st  Team relay, UCI World Championships
 1st  Team relay, UEC European Championships
 1st  Cross-country, National Championships
 1st Nalles
 1st Guiyang
 1st Vermiglio
 UCI Eliminator World Cup
2nd Houffalize
2013
 1st  Team relay, UCI World Championships
 UEC European Championships
1st  Team relay
2nd  Cross-country
2nd  Eliminator
 Internazionali d'Italia Series
1st Nalles
1st Montichiari
1st Lugagnano Val d'Arda
2nd Chies d'Alpago
2nd Vermiglio
 1st Jelenia Góra
 2nd Overall UCI XCO World Cup
1st Albstadt
2nd Hafjell
3rd Vallnord
 UCI Eliminator World Cup
2nd Hafjell
 2nd Eliminator, National Championships
 3rd Langkawi
2014
 1st  Cross-country, National Championships
 UCI XCO World Cup
1st Cairns
 1st Langkawi
 Internazionali d'Italia Series
2nd Nalles
 Swiss Bike Cup
2nd Solothurn
2015
 1st  Cross-country, National Championships
 1st Rio de Janeiro
 2nd  Cross-country, UEC European Championships
 Internazionali d'Italia Series
2nd Nalles
 2nd Graz
 3rd  Team relay, UCI World Championships
 Ötztaler Mountainbike Festival
3rd Haiming
2016
 1st  Cross-country, National Championships
 US Cup
1st San Dimas
2017
 Internazionali d'Italia Series
1st Courmayeur
 US Cup
3rd Fontana
2018
 1st  Cross-country, National Championships
 US Cup
3rd Fontana
2019
 Internazionali d'Italia Series
1st San Marino
2nd Andora
3rd Pineto
3rd La Thuile
 2nd  Team relay, UEC European Championships
 2nd Cross-country, National Championships
2020
 1st  Team relay, UEC European Championships
 1st  Cross-country, National Championships
 1st  Overall Transmaurienne Vanoise
 1st  Overall Andalucía Bike Race
 UCI World Championships
2nd  Cross-country
2nd  Team relay
2021
 National Championships
1st  Cross-country
1st  Eliminator

References

External links

Cross-country mountain bikers
Italian female cyclists
Italian mountain bikers
1985 births
Living people
Olympic cyclists of Italy
Cyclists at the 2008 Summer Olympics
Cyclists at the 2012 Summer Olympics
Cyclists at the 2016 Summer Olympics
Sportspeople from Bolzano
Cyclo-cross cyclists
UCI Mountain Bike World Champions (women)
Cyclists at the 2015 European Games
European Games competitors for Italy
Cyclists at the 2020 Summer Olympics
Cyclists from Trentino-Alto Adige/Südtirol